The 1885 Virginia gubernatorial election was held on November 3, 1885, to elect the governor of Virginia.

Results

References

1885
Virginia
gubernatorial
November 1885 events